Sunrise (stylized as SUNRISE) is the third full-length studio album by Japanese idol group Idoling!!!. It reached number 14 on the Oricon chart. It was released in three different versions: Premium, Standard, and Low-price. The premium package cover design was drawn by Hiro Mashima, the author of manga Fairy Tail.

The song "Sunrise" was used as the Fuji TV Kiseki Taiken! Unbelievable ending theme song for April to June 2010. "Tenohira no Yūki" was used as the Tokimeki Memorial 4 opening theme song under the name Tokimeki Idoling!!!. "Love Magic Fever" was used as image song for the Puyo Puyo 7 under the name Puyo Puyo Idoling!!!. "S.O.W Sense of Wonder" was used as opening theme song for the TV Tokyo anime Fairy Tail.

Contents
Sunrise was released in three versions:
 Premium Edition (CD, DVD, and photobook)
 Standard Edition (CD and DVD)
 Low-price Edition (CD only)

Track listing

CD

DVD
 Music clip of 
 Tenohira no Yūki
 Love Magic Fever
 S.O.W Sense of Wonder
 U
 Hōkago Telepathy
 Idoling!!! ga Kataru Liner Notes-ing
 Making of music clip of Tenohira no Yūki and Love Magic Fever, and photo session of Sunrise
 Odaiba Gasshūkoku 2009 Gasshūkoku Happy Stadium LIVE (2009.8.15) (Premium edition only)
 Odaiba Gasshūkoku 2009 Gasshūkoku Happy Stadium LIVE (2009.7.21) (Standard edition only)

Notes
 The song "Tenohira no Yūki" was sung by sub-unit Tokimeki Idoling!!!  (Mai Endō, Erica Tonooka, Rurika Yokoyama, Suzuka Morita, Hitomi Miyake, and Ai Ōkawa).
 The song "U" wassung by Mai Endō, Erika Yazawa, Phongchi, Yui Kawamura, Hitomi Sakai, and Ami Kikuchi.
 The song "Sunadokei" was sung by Erica Tonooka, Phongchi, Serina Nagano, Hitomi Sakai, Hitomi Miyake, Yurika Tachibana, and Ai Ōkawa.
 The song "San Dome no Kinenbi" was sung by Mai Endō, Erica Tonooka, Phongchi, Rurika Yokoyama, Yui Kawamura, and Nao Asahi.
 The song "Love Magic Fever" was sung by sub-unit Puyo Puyo Idoling!!! (Erika Yazawa, Phongchi, Yui Kawamura, Serina Nagano, Hitomi Sakai, Nao Asahi, Ami Kikuchi, and Kaede Hashimoto).
 The song "Hōkago Telepathy" was sung by Erica Tonooka, Rurika Yokoyama, Suzuka Morita, Serina Nagano, Nao Asahi, Hitomi Miyake, Yurika Tachibana, Ai Ōkawa, and Kaede Hashimoto.

References

External links 
 Idoling!!! official website - Fuji TV
 Official website - Pony Canyon

2010 albums
Pony Canyon albums
Idoling!!! albums